Knott's Siding was a railway siding on the Erica narrow gauge line in Gippsland, Victoria, Australia. The siding opened with the line.  After the closure of nearby Murie station in April 1914, the siding was opened to passenger traffic.

In 1922 a second siding was opened on the Knott's Siding known as Fullwood's Siding, this operated until 1941. The main Knott's Siding was closed in 1922, and was used only as a shunt from Fullwood's siding.

References

Disused railway stations in Victoria (Australia)
Transport in Gippsland (region)
Shire of Baw Baw
Walhalla railway line